St. Phillip North is a parliamentary constituency in Saint Philip Parish, Antigua and Barbuda.

It has 1,654 registered voters as of 2018.

The constituencies counting centre is the Nelvi N. Gore Primary School, in Willikies Village.

Voting History

Demographics 
Saint Philip North has 11 enumeration districts.

 60100 Willikies-North 
 60200 Willikies-West 
 60300 Willikies-Central 
 60401 Willikies-S_1 
 60402 Willikies-S_2 
 60500 Willikies-East 
 60900 Glanvilles-Central 
 61000 Glanvilles-Outer 
 61100 Seatons-Central 
 61200 Seatons-Coastal 
 61300 Newfield

References 

Constituencies of Antigua and Barbuda
Saint Philip Parish, Antigua and Barbuda